Pyrenula ochraceoflava is a species of corticolous, crustose lichen in the family Pyrenulaceae. It is a common lowland and coastal species with a pantropical distribution. Its distribution in the Pacific Ocean includes the Caroline Islands, Galápagos Islands, New Caledonia, Tuamotu, and Western Samoa. The lichen was first formally described by Finnish lichenologist William Nylander in 1858 as a species of Verrucaria. Richard Harris transferred it to the genus Pyrenula in 1989. The variety pacifica, found on the Cook Islands (South Pacific Ocean) was proposed by Patrick McCarthy in 2000. It is distinguished from the nominate variety by its pigmented thallus and perithecia, ascospore size and shape, and the presence of a single transverse septum in its ascospores.

See also
List of Pyrenula species

References

ochraceoflava
Lichen species
Lichens described in 1858
Lichens of North America
Lichens of South America
Lichens of the Pacific
Taxa named by William Nylander (botanist)